Himesh Reshammiya (born 23 July 1973) is an Indian playback singer, music director, songwriter, film & music producer and actor in Hindi cinema. He started his career as music director in the film Pyaar Kiya To Darna Kya in 1998 and made his acting debut with the film Aap Kaa Surroor in 2007.

Early and personal life 
Himesh Reshammiya was born in Mumbai to Vipin Reshammiya, an Indian music composer, and Madhu Reshammiya, on 23 July 1973. At the age of 21, Reshammiya married Komal and they have a son named Swaym.
On 12 September 2016, it was reported that Himesh and Komal mutually agreed to separate and file for divorce. On 11 May 2018, Himesh married his long-time girlfriend, actress Sonia Kapoor.

Music and film career

Early career (1998–2002) 
Reshammiya began producing TV series such as Andaz, Ahha, Aman, Aashiqui, Amar Prem and Jaan on Zee TV. He also composed title tracks for some of these shows.
Reshammiya's father was supposed to make a film with Salman Khan in the 1990s, but this did not take place; when Khan heard one of Reshammiya's compositions, he was impressed and promised to let him compose music for one of his films. In 1998, Reshammiya made his debut as a music composer with the Salman Khan film Pyaar Kiya To Darna Kya, composing two songs for the project: "Pyaar Kiya To Darna Kya" and "Tum Par Hum Hai Aatke". Both songs became hits.

He went on to compose music for Bandhan and Hello Brother, together with other composers. His first movie as a solo composer was another Salman Khan production, Dulhan Hum Le Jayenge. Reshammiya gained some prominence when he composed music for Humraaz. This earned him a nomination for Filmfare Award for Best Music Direction.

2003–2010 
Reshammiya gained more prominence when he composed songs for another Salman Khan film, Tere Naam (2003), for which he won several accolades, including the Zee Cine Award for Best Music Director and Screen Award for Best Music Director.
In 2004, he wrote music for ten films, among them Aitraaz. In 2005, he worked on ten more films, including Aashiq Banaya Apne and Maine Pyaar Kyun Kiya?.

At this point, he also began working as a playback singer with the song "Aashiq Banaya Aapne", which earned him numerous awards, including Filmfare Award for Best Male Playback Singer, IIFA Award for Best Male Playback, and Zee Cine Award for Best Male Playback Singer.

As a singer, Reshammiya has recorded multiple popular songs, such as "Aashiq Banaya Aapne", "Tera Suroor", "Zara Jhoom Jhoom", "Jhalak Dikhlaja", "Andaz Apna Apna", "Afsana", "Shakalaka Boom Boom", "Meri Awaargi", "Hookah Bar", "Chalao Na Naino Se", and "Tandoori Nights". His music has a style of composition based on a fusion of Western and Indian classical music, and Western and Indian Rock music accompanied by techno beats.

Reshammiya has also worked as an actor, beginning with the film Aap Kaa Surroor.

He was the first Indian singer to perform at Wembley Arena in London and the Heineken music hall in Amsterdam.

Reshammiya was actively involved in mentoring and judging the singing competition Sa Re Ga Ma Pa Challenge on Zee TV. His group was known as Jai Mata Di Let's Rock Gharana. He was the winning mentor of the show in 2007. In 2009, Vaishali Mhade, a female contestant from his Jai Mata Di Let's Rock Gharana group, won the singing competition. He is also the team captain, judge, and mentor on Star Plus's show Music Ka Maha Muqqabla for the team Himesh's Warriors. Reshammiya was also the judge of the musical reality show Sur Kshetra, which was telecasted on Sahara One. He appeared as the special guest in the Grand Finale of Jo Jeeta Wohi Superstar 2, where he also trained the top four contestants.

2011–2020 
On 4 November 2013, it was announced that Reshammiya would be acting in and producing a movie named The Xposé.

In April 2019, it was confirmed that Reshammiya would be back onscreen with the film Namastey Rome, which is a sequel to Namastey London and Namastey England. He also collaborated with lyricist Javed Akhtar in the film's soundtrack, as they had worked together on Namastey London. Reshammiya also acted in three other projects, one being a sequel of The Xposé, named The Xposé Returns. Reshammiya also confirmed that he would make a biopic about the soldier Bishnu Shrestha; the film would be based on his involvement in the Maurya Express train robbery.

2021–present 

On 5 June 2021, Reshammiya launched his music label Himesh Reshammiya Melodies and announced his upcoming studio album "Surroor 2021", the second album of the Surroor franchise to be released after 2006. The title track of the album "Surroor Tera" was released on 11 June 2021, which followed by the announcement of two new albums under the label Himesh Reshammiya Melodies, namely "Moods with Melodies" and "Himesh Ke Dil Se". Later in August, Reshammiya announced another album Super Sitaara, which will feature prominent singers from 90's era like Kumar Sanu, Alka Yagnik and lyricist Sameer. Surroor 2021 The Album garnered more than 200 million views on YouTube and more than 50 million audio streams on various platforms.
In 2022, he composed all the songs for Anand L. Rai's film Raksha Bandhan, collaborating with Akshay Kumar after ten years since Khiladi 786.

Controversies 
In his early singing career, when he was criticized for his nasal singing style, Reshammiya stated that R. D. Burman also sang through his nose. After this comment, Asha Bhosle, legendary singer and wife of Burman, said, "If anyone says Burman sa'ab sang through his nose, he should be slapped". Reshammiya subsequently clarified that he never intended to insult R. D. Burman.

In his debut film as an actor, Aap Kaa Surroor, Reshammiya added the song "Tanhaiyyan" from Boney Kapoor's proposed film Milenge Milenge. Initially, Reshammiya had composed the song for Kapoor's film, but later decided to use it for his own movie. Tips, which held the audio rights of Milenge Milenge, accused Reshammiya of copyright violation, as audio rights for "Aap Kaa Surroor – The Real Luv Story" were acquired by T-Series. However, Reshammiya defended himself, saying that he had made Kapoor listen to the song, but it was not included in Milenge Milenge. He also claimed to have tried to get in touch with Kapoor for seven months, and since there was no progress on the film, he decided to use the song for his own movie.

Awards and nominations 

Reshammiya won the Filmfare Award for Best Male Playback Singer in 2006 for Aashiq Banaya Aapne, as well as receiving several other awards such as the Star Screen Award, IIFA Award, and the Zee Cine Award. He also received several nominations for his music direction. Reshammiya additionally won a BIG Star Entertainment Award as best music director for Prem Ratan Dhan Payo.

Films and Discography

References

External links 

 
 
 

Living people
Bollywood playback singers
Gujarati people
Indian film score composers
Indian male film actors
Indian male playback singers
Indian male pop singers
Male actors in Hindi cinema
People from Bhavnagar
1973 births
Indian male film score composers
Hill Grange High School alumni
Filmfare Awards winners
International Indian Film Academy Awards winners
Zee Cine Awards winners
Himesh Reshammiya